Henry McKay may refer to:

 Harry McKay (politician) (1925–1987), Canadian lawyer
 Henry McKay (cricketer) (1883–1926), Australian cricketer
 Henry D. McKay (1899–1960), American sociologist